Baibokai (Polish: Bajbaki) may refer to:

, Biržai  District Municipality, Lithuania
, Panevėžys District Municipality, Lithuania
Baibokai, a former village in place of Šančiai, a district of Kaunas, Lithuania